The Singapore National Ice Hockey League is the ice hockey league in Singapore. It was first contested in 1995.

Champions
 2017: D1: Singapore Scotiabank, D2: JOG, D3: Momentum
 2016: Scotia
 2015: SEB
 2014: Triple-O Singapore
 2013: Singapore Scotiabank
 2010-2012: none
 2009: White Team
 2008: Harrys
 2007: San Miguel
 2006: M1 Hornets
 2005: Linear Technology Lions
 2004: Brewerkz Bruins
 2003: M1 Hornets
 2002: Continental Wings
 2001: Linear Technology Lions
 2000: Singapore Khalsa Association
 1999: Chenab
 1998: Singapore Recreation Club
 1997: Singapore Recreation Club
 1996: Singapore Indian Association
 1995: Singapore Recreation Club

References

External links
 List of champions on internationalhockey.net
 National Ice Hockey League of Singapore official website

Ice hockey in Singapore
Ice hockey leagues in Asia